Bryansky District is an administrative and municipal district (raion), one of the twenty-seven in Bryansk Oblast, Russia. It is located in the northeast of the oblast. Its administrative center is the rural locality (a selo) of Glinishchevo. Population:   52,959 (2002 Census);

Administrative and municipal status
Within the framework of administrative divisions, Bryansky District is one of the twenty-seven in the oblast. Until February 14, 2014, the city of Bryansk served as its administrative center, despite being incorporated separately as a city of oblast significance—an administrative unit with the status equal to that of the districts. Since February 14, 2014, the rural locality (a selo) of Glinishchevo has been the administrative center.

As a municipal division, the district is incorporated as Bryansky Municipal District. The city of oblast significance of Bryansk has always been incorporated separately from the district as Bryansk Urban Okrug.

References

Notes

Sources

Districts of Bryansk Oblast
 
